"Raindrops (Insane)" is a song by American record producer Metro Boomin and American rapper Travis Scott from the former's second studio album Heroes & Villains (2022). It was produced by Metro, Honorable C.N.O.T.E., Allen Ritter, David x Eli and Scriptplugg.

Composition
Robert Blair of HotNewHipHop described, "For Travis Scott, 'Raindrops' invokes the psychedelically-subdued cloud-rap sound of his Rodeo days". Scott mentions getting pleasure from taking drugs which relieve his pain ("Pill pop the pain, this purple rain").

Critical reception
The song received generally mixed reviews from critics. Robin Murray of Clash had a favorable reaction to the song, writing, "Travis Scott revs up 'Raindrops' adding an almost punk-like energy to the song". In a review of Heroes & Villains, Peter A. Berry of Complex considered it among the songs which although "can suffer from lyrical blandness, their melodies make them compelling anyways." Brady Brickner-Wood of Pitchfork gave a negative review, calling it "Travis Scott sounds half-asleep on the unimaginative 'Raindrops (Insane)'".

Charts

References

2022 songs
Metro Boomin songs
Travis Scott songs
Songs written by Metro Boomin
Songs written by Travis Scott
Song recordings produced by Metro Boomin
Song recordings produced by Allen Ritter
Cloud rap songs